The Men's League for Opposing Woman Suffrage (sometimes referred to as the Men's League for Opposing Women's Suffrage) was founded on 19 January 1909 with Lord Cromer as President, replacing the Men's Committee for Opposing Woman Suffrage, which had been founded in December 1908. In 1910 it merged with the Women's National Anti-Suffrage League to form the National League for Opposing Woman Suffrage.

Organizations established in 1909
Anti-suffragist organizations